Atractus favae, Filippi's ground snake,  is a species of snake in the family Colubridae. The species can be found in Suriname and Guyana.

References 

Atractus
Reptiles of Suriname
Reptiles of Guyana
Reptiles described in 1840
Taxa named by Filippo De Filippi